Carmen Cristina Toma (born 28 March 1989) is a Romanian athlete specialising in the triple jump. She won the bronze medal at the 2013 Summer Universiade.

She has personal bests of 14.29 metres outdoors (2009) and 13.89 metres indoors (2009).

Competition record

References

1989 births
Living people
Romanian female triple jumpers
Competitors at the 2011 Summer Universiade
Competitors at the 2015 Summer Universiade
Medalists at the 2013 Summer Universiade
Universiade medalists in athletics (track and field)
Universiade bronze medalists for Romania